Timperley is a tram stop on the Altrincham Line of Greater Manchester's light-rail Metrolink system. In western Timperley about a mile west of the village centre, it opened on 15 June 1992 as part of Phase 1 of Metrolink's expansion.

History

The station was opened on 20 July 1849 by the Manchester, South Junction and Altrincham Railway (MSJAR). It closed as a British Rail station on 24 December 1991 to permit conversion of the line and reopened as a Metrolink station on 15 June 1992.

The canopy on the Manchester platform was demolished in 2009. The former booking office was used as a taxi office for several years up to 2003 and in 2010 was converted to a coffee shop.

Services
Timperley is on the Altrincham Line with trams towards Altrincham stopping every 6 minutes during the day Monday to Saturday, every 12 minutes Monday to Saturday evenings and Sundays. Trams also head towards Piccadilly and Bury, with the Monday to Saturday daytime service running every 12 minutes each to Piccadilly or Bury, while evening and Sunday journeys run to Piccadilly only.

Service pattern 
10 trams per hour to Altrincham (5 offpeak)
5 trams per hour to Bury (peak only)
5 trams per hour to Piccadilly

Ticket zone 
As of January 2019, Timperley is located in Metrolink ticket zone 4.

Connecting bus routes
Timperley station is not directly served by any bus service, although the 20 stops further down Park Road and runs to Altrincham and to Timperley Grange. The service is run by Manchester Community Transport during the day Monday-Saturdays and by M Travel during evenings and on Sundays.

References

Further reading

External links

Timperley Stop Information
Timperley area map

Tram stops in Trafford
Former Manchester, South Junction and Altrincham Railway stations
Tram stops on the Altrincham to Bury line
Railway stations in Great Britain opened in 1849
Railway stations in Great Britain closed in 1991
Railway stations in Great Britain opened in 1992
Tram stops on the Altrincham to Piccadilly line
1849 establishments in England